Gilesgate is a place in County Durham, England. It is situated east of the centre of Durham. It is also a ward of Durham with a total population taken at the 2011 census was 8,074.

Gilesgate was originally the main street in a settlement associated with the Hospital of St Giles which was sited by the existing St Giles Church.  The street was divided in the 1960s by the construction of the A690 and the demolition of a number of houses, pubs and shops at the foot of Gilesgate Bank to construct a roundabout.  East of Gilesgate itself was Gilesgate Moor.  During the 19th century, housing extended along the Sherburn and Sunderland Roads and the colliery village of New Durham was built within the parish.  Additional housing was constructed along the Sherburn Road in the 1930s, including the Sherburn Road Estate, built to house residents from the slums of Framwelgate. Following the Second World War, a further council housing estate was constructed north of the Sunderland Road with the streets taking the names of war leaders and local recipients of the Victoria Cross.  In modern usage Gilesgate can refer to the street, the smaller area (partly following old council boundaries) consisting of the street above the roundabout and the Sunderland Road estate, Gilesgate Moor and High Grange Estate.

Modern Gilesgate
The areas closest to the city have proved popular with students at Durham University. This is helped by the location of the College of St Hild and St Bede, and the education department on the edge of Gilesgate.

There are shops sited around Gilesgate such as a large Tesco Extra and a number of pubs, including New Durham Club and the Queens Head.

The historic parish church of St Giles is a grade I listed building, with the Roman Catholic church of St Joseph located on Mill Lane. Local primary schools include Gilesgate, Laurel Avenue, St Hilds (Church of England) and St Joseph's (Roman Catholic). It also has 2 retail parks containing shops such as KFC, B and Q, Currys and PC World which are known as Durham Retail Park and Dragonville Retail Park.

See also

 Kepier Hospital

References
Margot Johnson. "Gilesgate and St. Mary Magdalene" in Durham: Historic and University City and surrounding area. Sixth Edition. Turnstone Ventures. 1992. . Page 15.

Areas of Durham, England
Unparished areas in County Durham